Tatiana Sergeyevna Akimova, née Semenova (born 26 October 1990) is a Russian biathlete. She competes in the Biathlon World Cup, and represents Russia at the Biathlon World Championships 2016.

Results

Olympic Games

World Championships

*The single mixed relay was added as an event in 2019.

World Cup

Individual Victories
 1 victory – (1 Sp)

References

External links

1990 births
Living people
Russian female biathletes
Biathlon World Championships medalists
People from Cheboksary
Biathletes at the 2018 Winter Olympics
Olympic biathletes of Russia
Universiade gold medalists for Russia
Universiade bronze medalists for Russia
Universiade medalists in biathlon
Competitors at the 2013 Winter Universiade
Sportspeople from Chuvashia
21st-century Russian women